Dian Bachar (born October 26, 1970) is an American actor most notable for his roles in various films by or starring his friends Trey Parker and Matt Stone, such as Cannibal! The Musical (George Noon), Orgazmo (Ben Chapleski) and his most famous role as Kenny "Squeak" Scolari in 1998's BASEketball, as well as making the occasional appearance on South Park.

Career
Dian Bachar attended Chatfield Senior High School. Bachar then received his BFA in Film Production at the University of Colorado at Boulder where he met Matt Stone and Trey Parker. From there, he went on to star in the student film, Cannibal! The Musical, for internship credit. Bachar also co-starred with Parker in Orgazmo, playing the eponymous character's sidekick "Choda Boy", and played multiple parts in Parker and Stone's short-lived series Time Warped.

Bachar shared an apartment with Parker and Stone up until 1997. When BASEketball was in the works, Parker asked David Zucker to change the script to allow for three players on each team (it was supposed to be just two to a team) to allow for Bachar to have a part in the movie.

In 1998, Bachar won a Leonardo da Vinci Award from the Beaux Arts Society, Inc. in the category of Actor, Debut Performance (Film) for his role in BASEketball  and an award for Best Actor in the 2012 short film Coaching Me Softly at the 48-Hour Film Project.

Most recently, Bachar starred in the horror feature The Murders of Brandywine Theater and the western drama short film Homestead.  He is the co-owner of Bonobo Mountain Films with partner Carrie Rapaport.

South Park appearances
Due to his friendship with creators Parker and Stone, Bachar had provided several guest voices on their animated series South Park.
"Cow Days" - voicing the game show announcer.
"Merry Christmas Charlie Manson!" - voicing the fake Mr. Hankey.
"Do the Handicapped Go to Hell?" - voicing Satan's lover Chris.
"Probably" - again voicing Satan's lover, Chris.

Short films
Bachar and fellow actor Sam Macaroni are the leads in both of the internet series Roommates: The Series and Dimwits.

Music videos
Bachar appears in The Melvins "The Talking Horse" music video, and starred in and directed the music video "Rock Hard Soul" for the Chicago-based band, JIP.

Filmography

References

External links

Dian Bachar at NYTimes.com

1970 births
American male film actors
Living people
Male actors from Denver
University of Colorado Boulder alumni